Flight 102 may refer to:

Interflug Flight 102, crashed on 17 June 1989
National Airlines Flight 102, crashed on 29 April 2013
American Airlines Flight 102, crashed on 14 April 1993

0102